Juan Ramírez de Velasco (c.1539 – 1597) was a Spanish conquistador of Chile and Argentina. Founder of the province of La Rioja.

Biography
Juan Ramírez de Velasco was born in the village of Estollo, son of a noble family of Castile, and descendant of the King of Navarre Ramiro Sánchez. In 1570 Ramirez was married in Seville with Catherine de Ugarte, a Spanish noblewoman, daughter of Pedro Santiago de Ugarte and Ana de Velasco.

Career
In his youth Ramírez fought in Flanders and Italy during the Italian War of 1551–59. Arrived in America Ramirez was appointed governor of Tucumán by Philip II of Spain to replace Hernando de Lerma. Ramírez served in the government of Tucuman between 1586-1593.

In 1588 being the governor of Tucumán Juan Ramirez de Velasco made expeditions against the Indians in calchaquí valley and won the allegiance of a son of Juan Calchaquí. Shortly after he founded the city of Todos los Santos de la Nueva Rioja. In 1592 he founded the city of Madrid de las Juntas in the present department Metán.

In 1594 Juan Ramírez Velasco was appointed commander of the Governorate of the Rio de la Plata a position he held between 1595-1597. He was replaced by Hernando Arias de Saavedra.
 
Juan Ramirez de Velasco died in February 1597 in the City of Santa Fe, Argentina.

Notes

External links
www.portaldesalta.gov.ar

1539 births
1597 deaths
Spanish colonial governors and administrators
Governors of Paraguay
People from Santa Fe, Argentina
People from La Rioja Province, Argentina
Castilian conquistadors
Governors of the Río de la Plata